The year 1979 in archaeology involved some significant events.

Explorations
 Tillya Tepe surveyed by a Soviet-Afghan mission of archaeologists led by Victor Sarianidi.

Excavations
 Hengistbury Head by Barry Cunliffe (continues to 1984).

Finds
 July - Fossil hominid footprints found at Laetoli, Tanzania, by Mary Leakey.
 Wreck of  found off Western Australia.
 Wreck of  found on the Goodwin Sands.
 Wreck of English ship Swan (1641) found off the west coast of Scotland.
 Wreck of French-built English ship  found in The Solent.
 Burial site related to the 1918 execution of the Romanov family at Yekaterinburg, by Alexander Avdonin.
 Roman fort at Elginhaugh discovered by air-photography.
 Black rat bones from about the fifth century AD reported as found in York, the first pre-medieval record in England.
 The prehistoric site of Isernia La Pineta discovered during the construction of a road link of Strada statale 85.

Publications
 Aubrey Burl - Prehistoric Avebury.
 J. M. Coles and A. F. Harding - The Bronze Age in Europe: an introduction to the prehistory of Europe, c.2000–700 BC.
 Kenneth Hudson - World Industrial Archaeology.
 A. L. F. Rivet and Colin Smith - The Place-names of Roman Britain.
 Anglo-Saxon Studies in Archaeology and History series founded by David Brown, James Campbell, and Sonia Chadwick Hawkes.

Events
 June 2 - Protesters opposed to the building of civic offices on the site of Viking excavations in Wood Quay, Dublin, occupy the area.

Births
 February 8 - Stuart Wilson, English archaeologist working in Wales

Deaths
 January 15 - Yang Zhongjian, father of Chinese vertebrate paleontology, buried at Peking Man site in Zhoukoudian, China (b. 1897)
 January 20 - Robert Wauchope, American archaeologist and anthropologist (b. 1909)
 January 24 - Raissa Calza, Ukrainian-born archaeologist of Ancient Rome, previously ballet dancer (b. 1894)
 August 1 - Li Ji, Chinese archaeologist (b. 1896)
 August 25 - Alberto Ruz Lhuillier, Mexican archaeologist, discoverer of the tomb of K'inich Janaab' Pakal at Palenque (b. 1906)
 December 14 - Charles McBurney, American-born archaeologist working in Britain (b. 1914)

References

Archaeology
Archaeology
Archaeology by year